Jökull is the name of:

Jökull Andrésson, Icelandic footballer
Jökull Júlíusson, Icelandic singer
Jökull (journal), Icelandic academic journal